To Diz with Love is a live album by trumpeter Dizzy Gillespie with an array of guest stars recorded at the Blue Note in 1992 and released on the Telarc label. The album, along with To Bird with Love and Bird Songs: The Final Recordings, represent the last recordings made by the trumpeter before his death in 1993.

Reception
The Allmusic review stated "Although he was no longer up to the competition, the love that these fellow trumpeters had for Gillespie (and some fine solos) makes this historic CD worth getting".

Track listing
 "Billie's Bounce" (Charlie Parker) - 14:31 
 "Confirmation" (Parker) - 10:27 
 "Mood Indigo" (Barney Bigard, Duke Ellington, Irving Mills) - 12:48 
 "Straight, No Chaser" (Thelonious Monk) - 11:22 
 "A Night in Tunisia" (Dizzy Gillespie, Felix Paparelli) - 16:40

Personnel
Dizzy Gillespie - trumpet
Doc Cheatham (track 3), Jon Faddis (track 3), Wynton Marsalis (tracks 2 & 4), Claudio Roditi (tracks 1 & 5), Wallace Roney (tracks 1 & 5), Charlie Sepulveda (track 4), Lew Soloff (unbilled, track 5) - trumpet
Red Rodney - flugelhorn (track 2)
Junior Mance - piano
Peter Washington - bass
Kenny Washington - drums

References 

Telarc Records live albums
Dizzy Gillespie live albums
1992 live albums
Albums recorded at the Blue Note Jazz Club